Terence Yin Chi-wai (born 19 May 1975) is a Hong Kong film actor, singer, producer, and media relations specialist. Yin has starred in over 30 movies, released one solo album and resides in Hong Kong.

Early life 
May 19, 1975, Yin was born in Hong Kong. Yin's mother was Jenny Hu, a 1960s–70s Shaw Brothers Studios actress. Yin's father was Kang Wei (1940-2013), a film director. Yin has one older brother, Christopher Yin.

In 1983, at 7 years old, Yin and his brother Christopher came to Los Angeles, California. In 1993, Yin graduated from Mark Keppel High School in Alhambra, California.

Education 
In 1997, Yin earned a  Philosophy (Rhetorics) degree from UC Berkeley.

Career 
Yin made his film debut in Yonfan's 1998 Bishonen opposite Daniel Wu, one of his close friends and frequent collaborators.

Yin released a solo album in Taiwan in 1999 titled Undecided, which met with limited success.

In 2003 Yin with fellow Hong Kong actor Simon Yam made their Hollywood debut in the film Lara Croft: Tomb Raider – The Cradle of Life as the villains Chen Lo and Xien Lo, brothers who are in a fictional Chinese syndicate called the Shay Ling who are opposite of the lead character Lara Croft portrayed by Angelina Jolie.

In 2005, Yin, with Daniel Wu, Conroy Chan, and Andrew Lin formed a boyband experiment named Alive.

In 2012, Yin, made his second Hollywood appearance in the film The Man with the Iron Fists, which had a diverse cast of Hollywood, Hong Kong and Chinese actors. He also appeared in the 2012 Hong Kong film Cold War and voiced the character Dirty Ming in the video game Sleeping Dogs.

Yin is a partner in the online social network Alivenotdead.com with his Alive bandmates and the founders of the movie website Rotten Tomatoes. The site, created to support the movie The Heavenly Kings and Alive, was relaunched in April 2007 as an online community supporting artists worldwide.

Filmography

References

External links
Terence Yin's official blog

 Terence Yin and Raquel Xu Make Up and Are Now Engaged

1975 births
Living people
Hong Kong emigrants to the United States
American male film actors
Male actors from Los Angeles
UC Berkeley College of Letters and Science alumni
American male actors of Chinese descent
20th-century Hong Kong male actors
21st-century Hong Kong male actors
American people of German descent
Hong Kong people of German descent